Ndungane is a surname. Notable people with the surname include:

Akona Ndungane (born 1981), South African rugby union player
Odwa Ndungane (born 1981), South African rugby union player, twin of Akona
Njongonkulu Ndungane (born 1941), Archbishop of Cape Town

Xhosa-language surnames